Expansions is an album by keyboardist Lonnie Liston Smith, featuring performances recorded in 1974 and released by the Flying Dutchman label the following year.

Reception

In his review for AllMusic, Thom Jurek stated, "It is fully a jazz album, and a completely funky soul-jazz disc as well ... Smith plays both piano and electric keyboards and keeps his compositions on the jazzy side -- breezy, open, and full of groove playing that occasionally falls over to the funk side of the fence ... Summery and loose in feel, airy and free with its in-the-cut beats and stellar piano fills, Expansions prefigures a number of the "smooth jazz" greats here, without the studio slickness and turgid lack of imagination. ... The music on Expansions is timeless soul-jazz, perfect in every era. Of all the fusion records of this type released in the mid-'70s, Expansions provided smoother jazzers and electronica's sampling wizards with more material that Smith could ever have anticipated".

Track listing
All compositions by Lonnie Liston Smith except where noted
 "Expansions" − 6:04
 "Desert Nights" − 6:42
 "Summer Days" − 5:50
 "Voodoo Woman" (Smith, Michael Carvin) − 4:20
 "Peace" (Horace Silver, Doug Carn) − 4:15
 "Shadows" − 6:20
 "My Love" − 5:43

Personnel
Lonnie Liston Smith − piano, electric piano, electronic keyboard textures
Donald Smith − flute, vocals, vocal textures 
Dave Hubbard − soprano saxophone, tenor saxophone, alto flute (tracks 2-4, 6 & 7)
Cecil McBee − bass
Art Gore − drums
Michael Carvin − percussion, clavinet, drums (tracks 1, 2 & 4, 6 & 7)
Leopoldo Fleming − bongos, percussion (tracks 1-4, 6 & 7)
Lawrence Killian − congas, percussion (tracks 1-4, 6 & 7)

References

1975 albums
Albums produced by Bob Thiele
Flying Dutchman Records albums
Jazz-funk albums
RCA Records albums
Lonnie Liston Smith albums